The 2006 Commonwealth Games, officially known as the 18th Commonwealth Games, were a multi-sport event held in Melbourne, Victoria, Australia between 15 and 26 March 2006. A total of 4,071 athletes representing 71 Commonwealth Games Associations participated in 247 events from 16 sports. A total of 743 medals were awarded over the course of the Games.

Medal table

References

External links
 Medal table from official website

Medal table
2006